Hordeum distichon, the common barley or two-rowed barley, is a cultigen of barley, family Poaceae. It is native to Iraq, and is widely grown throughout temperate regions of the world. Some authorities consider it a subspecies of six-rowed barley, Hordeum vulgare. It is the principal raw material for malting and brewing beer in Europe, as it is lower in protein than the six-rowed barley usually used in North America.

References

distichon
Barley
Flora of Iraq
Plants described in 1753
Taxa named by Carl Linnaeus